LIFEYO is a website hosting company founded in Newport Beach, CA.  Lifeyo allows users to make websites without using HTML or managing a hosting account.

Lifeyo competes with other website builders such as Yola, Jimdo, Webs, Weebly, and Wix.

Features
Lifeyo offers templates that allow users to get started building their website quickly.  Users can choose from different website types (business, personal, portfolio, and blogging) that provide a starting point with placeholder content.  The WYSIWYG website builder allows users to customize website pages in a visual manner that does not require any HTML coding expertise.  Users of Lifeyo can build websites using the blogging interface and photo gallery features.  A feature that was unique to Lifeyo is the ability to collaborate on a website with multiple editors.  The service is free and does not apply ads on websites created by users. For a fee the company offers an upgrade to a domain name.

History
Lifeyo was released to the public in 2010 at the South By Southwest Interactive conference in Austin, Texas.  It was a startup launched by Mike Kai and Wiwat Ruengmee.  Lifeyo has offices based in Newport Beach, California and Bangkok, Thailand.

Reception
In 2010, Erez Zukerman of AOL News gave a positive review to Lifeyo.  Zukerman described Lifeyo as an "Incredible content-management system for someone just trying to put together their first website.”

References

External links
 

Web hosting
Free web hosting services
Web development software